Monster-in-Law is a 2005 romantic comedy film directed by Robert Luketic, written by Anya Kochoff and starring Jennifer Lopez, Jane Fonda, Michael Vartan and Wanda Sykes. It marked a return to cinema for Fonda, being her first film in 15 years since Stanley & Iris in 1990. The film was negatively received by critics who praised Fonda's performance but panned the screenplay, and Lopez's performance. Monster-in-Law was a box office success, grossing $154 million on a $43 million budget.

Plot
Charlie Cantilini is a temp/dog walker/yoga instructor and aspiring fashion designer from Venice Beach, California, who meets doctor Kevin Fields. At first, she believes he is gay because of a lie his vindictive ex-girlfriend Fiona told her, but Kevin later asks her out and she feels she has finally found the right man.

Things start to sour when Kevin introduces Charlie to his mother Viola, a former newscaster-turned-talk show host who was recently replaced by someone younger, leading to her having a meltdown and attacking a guest on-air. Loathing Charlie immediately, Viola becomes more distraught when Kevin proposes to her, fearing she will lose her son just as she lost her career. Determined to ruin Kevin and Charlie's relationship, she enlists the help of her loyal assistant Ruby as well as Fiona. At the engagement party, Fiona kisses Kevin as he is dressing in his room, deeply hurting Charlie who feels out of place in Kevin’s world, exactly as Viola and Fiona planned. Viola feigns an anxiety attack and moves in with Charlie while Kevin is away for a medical conference, hoping to drive her crazy with her antics.

Charlie soon catches onto Viola's plan and retaliates by destroying her bedroom and tampering with her anti-psychotic medication (which Viola had replaced with vitamin C tablets). Charlie eventually confronts her, forcing her to move out. Finding no way to stop the wedding, Viola tricks Charlie into eating nuts during the rehearsal dinner, causing an extreme allergic reaction, resulting in Charlie's face swelling up. Luckily, it subsides by morning.

On the day of the wedding, Viola turns up wearing an extravagant white dress instead of the peach-colored one Charlie had specially made for her. This leads to a violent standoff between them, with Viola refusing to accept Charlie and declaring she will never be good enough for Kevin.

Suddenly, Viola's own dreadful mother-in-law, Kevin's grandmother Gertrude, arrives and they have an indignant argument, with Gertrude holding her responsible for the "terminal disappointment", from which Gertrude claims her son, Kevin's father, died many years earlier. Gertrude's resentment of Viola bears a strong resemblance to Viola's animosity towards Charlie, who decides to back down as she feels the same thing will happen to them in 30 years.

Charlie leaves to tell Kevin the wedding is off, but before she can, Ruby finally gets through to Viola. Viola resentfully expresses disbelief over being compared to Gertrude, but Ruby points out that Viola is actually far worse, as Gertrude never tried to poison her (referring to the rehearsal dinner incident), as well as the fact that she wore black to Viola's wedding due to being "in mourning" for her son, a contrasting but still disrespectful mirror of Viola's own behavior. When Viola claims that she just wants her son to be happy, Ruby asks her what made her think he was not happy with Charlie.

Viola has an epiphany and ultimately realizes that she wants Charlie to stay and tells her that she will leave the two of them alone if that means her son is happy. Charlie, however, tells Viola that she wants her to be a part of their lives, with some boundaries and ground rules.

Charlie and Kevin get married and, when she throws the bouquet, Viola (now wearing the peach-colored dress) catches it. As the newlyweds drive away to their honeymoon, Viola and Ruby leave to go out drinking.

Cast
 Jennifer Lopez as Charlotte "Charlie" Cantilini
 Jane Fonda as Viola Fields
 Michael Vartan as Dr. Kevin Fields
 Wanda Sykes as Ruby
 Adam Scott as Remy
 Monet Mazur as Fiona
 Annie Parisse as Morgan
 Will Arnett as Kit
 Elaine Stritch as Gertrude Fields
 Stephen Dunham as Dr. Paul Chamberlain

Reception
, the film holds an 18% approval rating on Rotten Tomatoes, based on 169 reviews with an average rating of 4.28/10. The website's critical consensus reads, "While Jane Fonda steals the movie in her return to the screen, a tired script and flimsy performances make this borderline comedy fall flat." On Metacritic the film has a weighted average score of 31 out of 100, based on reviews from 38 critics, indicating "generally unfavorable reviews". Audiences polled by CinemaScore gave the film an average grade of "B+" on an A+ to F scale.

Roger Ebert of the Chicago Sun-Times gave the film one out of possible four stars, saying: "You do not keep Jane Fonda offscreen for 15 years, only to bring her back as a specimen of rabid Momism. You write a role for her. It makes sense. It fits her. You like her in it. It gives her a relationship with Jennifer Lopez that could plausibly exist in our time and space. It gives her a son who has not wandered over after the "E.R." auditions. And it doesn't supply a supporting character who undercuts every scene she's in by being more on-topic than any of the leads." Joe Morgenstern of the Wall Street Journal also panned the movie, and used his review to deride the state of big-budget film-making, writing: "Films like this ... are emblematic of Hollywood's relentless dumbing-down and defining-down of big-screen attractions. There's an audience for such stuff, but little enthusiasm or loyalty. Adult moviegoers are being ignored almost completely during all but the last two or three months of each year, while even the kids who march off to the multiplexes each weekend know they're getting moldy servings of same-old, rather than entertainments that feed their appetite for surprise and delight." Mick LaSalle of the San Francisco Chronicle was one of the few critics who gave the film a positive review, writing: "It's a crude, obvious comedy, which occasionally clunks, but it's often very funny, as well as being a really shrewd bit of popular entertainment. Its appeal resides in a lot of things, not the least of which is a sophisticated awareness of what an audience brings to it."

Box office
The film ran 849 sneak preview screenings on Mother's Day at 4pm, the Sunday before release. New Line's president of domestic distribution David Tuckerman publicly stated his doubts about this strategy but the film achieved 90% attendance and he stated "the marketing department hit a home run." The film became a box-office success debuting at number #1 at the box office during its first weekend and earning $24 million. By the end of its run, the movie earned $83 million at the domestic box office and a worldwide total of $154.7 million, against an estimated production budget of $43 million.

Accolades
Lopez earned a Golden Raspberry Award nomination for Worst Actress for her performance in the film, but lost to Jenny McCarthy for Dirty Love.

Television series
On October 13, 2014, it was reported that Fox was developing a television series based on the film with Amy B. Harris as creator. In 2021, E! Entertainment reported that the series "didn't ultimately happen".

References

External links
 
 
 

2005 films
2005 romantic comedy films
2000s American films
2000s English-language films
2000s German films
American romantic comedy films
English-language German films
Films about dysfunctional families
Films about mother–son relationships
Films about weddings
Films directed by Robert Luketic
Films scored by David Newman
Films set in Los Angeles
Films shot in Los Angeles
German romantic comedy films
New Line Cinema films